Chloroleucon extortum is a species of flowering plant in the family Fabaceae. It is endemic to Brazil.

References

extortum
Flora of Brazil
Vulnerable plants
Taxonomy articles created by Polbot